A conjugate vaccine is a type of subunit vaccine which combines a weak antigen with a strong antigen as a carrier so that the immune system has a stronger response to the weak antigen.

Vaccines are used to prevent diseases by invoking an immune response to an antigen, part of a bacterium or virus that the immune system recognizes. This is usually accomplished with an attenuated or dead version of a pathogenic bacterium or virus in the vaccine, so that the immune system can recognize the antigen later in life.

Most vaccines contain a single antigen that the body will recognize. However, the antigen of some pathogens does not elicit a strong response from the immune system, so a vaccination against this weak antigen would not protect the person later in life. In this case, a conjugate vaccine is used in order to invoke an immune system response against the weak antigen. In a conjugate vaccine, the weak antigen is covalently attached to a strong antigen, thereby eliciting a stronger immunological response to the weak antigen. Most commonly, the weak antigen is a polysaccharide that is attached to strong protein antigen. However, peptide/protein and protein/protein conjugates have also been developed.

History 
The idea of a conjugate vaccine first appeared in experiments involving rabbits in 1927, when the immune response to the Streptococcus pneumoniae type 3 polysaccharide antigen was increased by combining the polysaccharide antigen with a protein carrier. The first conjugate vaccine used in humans became available in 1987. This was the Haemophilus influenzae type b (Hib) conjugate, which protects against meningitis. The vaccine was soon incorporated with the schedule for infant immunization in the United States. The Hib conjugate vaccine is combined with one of several different carrier proteins, such as the diphtheria toxoid or the tetanus toxoid. Soon after the vaccine was made available the rates of Hib infection dropped, with a decrease of 90.7% between 1987 and 1991. Infection rates diminished even more once the vaccine was made available for infants.

Technique 
Vaccines evoke an immune response to an antigen, and the immune system reacts by producing T cells and antibodies. The B memory cells remember the antigen so that if the body encounters it later, antibodies can be produced by B cells to break down the antigen. For bacteria with a polysaccharide coating, the immune response creates B cells independent of T cell stimulation. By conjugating the polysaccharide to a protein carrier, a T cell response can be induced. Normally, polysaccharides by themselves cannot be loaded onto the major histocompatibility complex (MHC) of antigen presenting cells (APC) because MHC can only bind peptides. In the case of a conjugate vaccine, the carrier peptide linked to the polysaccharide target antigen is able to be presented on the MHC molecule and the T cell can be activated. This improves the vaccine as T cells stimulate a more vigorous immune response and also promote a more rapid and long-lasting immunologic memory. The conjugation of polysaccharide target antigen to the carrier protein also increases efficiency of the vaccine, as a non conjugated vaccine against the polysaccharide antigen is not effective in young children. The immune systems of young children are not able to recognize the antigen as the polysaccharide covering disguises the antigen. By combining the bacterial polysaccharide with another antigen, the immune system is able to respond.

Approved conjugate vaccines 

The most commonly used conjugate vaccine is the Hib conjugate vaccine. Other pathogens that are combined in a conjugate vaccine to increase an immune response are Streptococcus pneumoniae (see pneumococcal conjugate vaccine) and Neisseria meningitidis (see meningococcal vaccine), both of which are conjugated to protein carriers like those used in the Hib conjugate vaccine. Both Streptococcus pneumoniae and Neisseria meningitidis are similar to Hib in that infection can lead to meningitis.

In 2018, World Health Organization recommended the use of the typhoid conjugate vaccine which may be more effective and prevents typhoid fever in many children under the age of five years.

In 2021, Soberana 02, a conjugate COVID-19 vaccine developed in Cuba, was given emergency use authorisation in Cuba and Iran.

Select list of other conjugate vaccines 
 Various immunocontraception vaccines for animal use, including GonaCon (GnRH linked to keyhole limpet hemocyanin)
 NicVAX, which aims to vaccinate against nicotine using a chemically modified hapten version linked to exotoxin A
 TA-CD, cocaine linked to inactivated cholera toxin
 TA-NIC, nicotine linked to inactivated cholera toxin

See also 

 Toxoid
 Vaccine
 T cell
 B cell
 Immunogenicity
 Immune system
 Immune response

References

External links 
 
 

 
Vaccines
Vaccination